Beyond the Black Hole is a computer game developed by The Software Toolworks and published in 1989 for the Commodore 64, Commodore 128, and MS-DOS, as well as for the Nintendo Entertainment System in 1990 under the name Orb-3D.

Plot
The player is a scientific officer sent to investigate some strange phenomena. Using cartography orbs, the player must examine a variety of objects in space. Two rebound fields are located on the left and right side of the screen make certain the cartography orb is reflected back into the middle of the screen when it reaches the outermost edges of the current screen. The orbs require fuel as the player dives from the peak of orbit into the objects center-screen. The player garners points by striking an object with the orb. Pirates can steal fuel, and the player must maneuver the orb through the fueling pods to reach the service center itself.

Gameplay
Beyond the Black Hole is stereoscopic 3-D arcade game which comes with 3-D glasses. The player commands the "craft" through space using the keyboard, a joystick, or a mouse. The game is playable without the glasses, as the game uses motion, not color, to generate the 3-D effect.

Reception
Beyond the Black Hole was reviewed in 1989 in Dragon #152 by Hartley, Patricia, and Kirk Lesser in "The Role of Computers" column. The reviewers gave the game 5 out of 5 stars. Compute! was less positive, stating that the game "is heavy on packaging and special effects and light on gameplay". The magazine hoped that "a more substantial game" would use the "impressive 3-D effect".

References

External links
Beyond the Black Hole at MobyGames
Beyond the Black Hole at GameSpot
Beyond the Black Hole at GameFAQs

1989 video games
Commodore 64 games
DOS games
Nintendo Entertainment System games
The Software Toolworks games
Video games developed in the United States